EPRU may refer to:

 Eastern Pennsylvania Rugby Union, a geographical unit for rugby union teams in Eastern and Central Pennsylvania
 Eastern Province Rugby Union, the governing body of rugby union in the Eastern Cape, including professional team the Eastern Province Elephants